Eupogonius pilosulus is a species of beetle in the family Cerambycidae. It was described by Chevrolat in 1862. It is known from Cuba and Jamaica.

References

Eupogonius
Beetles described in 1862